The Secătura is a right tributary of the river Izvor in Romania. It flows into the Izvor in Peștiș.

References

 Plan Urbanistic General-ORASUL ALESD - Primaria Alesd 

Rivers of Romania
Rivers of Bihor County